Haverford College (CDP) is a census-designated place located in Haverford Township, Delaware County, and Lower Merion Township, Montgomery County, in the U.S. state of Pennsylvania. As of the 2010 census, the population was 1,331.

Demographics

References

External links

Census-designated places in Delaware County, Pennsylvania
Census-designated places in Montgomery County, Pennsylvania
Census-designated places in Pennsylvania